Belanitra is a rural commune in Madagascar. It belongs to the district of Anjozorobe (district), which is a part of Analamanga Region. The population of the commune was estimated 2,911  in 2019.

It is situated in the north of the capital of Antananarivo.

References

Populated places in Analamanga